The Beach Boys are an American rock band formed in Hawthorne, California, in 1961. Since then, the band has undergone many variations in composition, with representation by fill-ins onstage. As of 2021, the only principal members included in the Beach Boys' touring band are co-founder Mike Love and 1965 addition Bruce Johnston.

In 1998, Love sought authorization through the Beach Boys' corporation, Brother Records Inc. (BRI) to tour as "The Beach Boys" and secured the necessary license. Even though Brian Wilson and Al Jardine have not performed with Love and Johnston's band since their one-off 2012 reunion tour, they remain a part of BRI.

1961–1964: Early years

The group's instrumental combo initially involved Brian Wilson on bass guitar and keyboards, Carl Wilson on guitar, and Dennis Wilson on drums. Nine months after forming a proper group with their cousin Mike Love and friend Al Jardine, the Beach Boys acquired national success, and demand for their personal appearance skyrocketed. Biographer James Murphy said, "By most contemporary accounts, they were not a very good live band when they started. ... The Beach Boys learned to play as a band in front of live audiences", but noted that they eventually became "one of the best and enduring live bands".

In March 1962, Jardine was replaced by rhythm guitarist/vocalist David Marks. Jardine returned in spring 1963 so Brian could make fewer touring appearances. Issues between Marks, his parents, and manager/the Wilsons' father Murry led Marks to quit in October 1963, forcing Brian to appear full-time on the road again and Jardine to switch to rhythm guitar.

1964's Beach Boys Concert was their first live album featuring all 5 original members,  their only number one album in the US, and the first live album that ever topped pop music record charts, maintaining its position for four weeks during a sixty-two-week chart stay, and becoming a gold seller.

1965–1998: Carl Wilson era

1960s–1970s

By the end of 1964, the stress of road travel, composing, producing and maintaining a high level of creativity became too much for Brian. On December 23, while on a flight from Los Angeles to Houston, he suffered a panic attack only hours after performing with the Beach Boys. In January 1965, he announced his withdrawal from touring to concentrate entirely on songwriting and record production. For the rest of 1964 and into 1965, Glen Campbell served as Wilson's temporary replacement in concert, until his own career success pulled him from the group in April 1965. Bruce Johnston was asked to locate a replacement for Campbell; having failed to find one, Johnston himself became a full-time member of the band on May 19, 1965, first replacing Brian on the road and later contributing in the studio, beginning with the vocal sessions for "California Girls" on June 4, 1965.

Carl subsequently became the musical director of the band onstage; contracts at that time stipulated that promoters hire "Carl Wilson plus four other musicians". Throughout 1965, Brian still performed live with the Beach Boys, but only on justified occasions. Shortly after completing the recording of the imminent Smiley Smile (1967), the band scheduled two performances in Hawaii for a prospective live album, Lei'd in Hawaii, that would be released on their new record label, Brother Records. Difficulties arose around this time. Johnston refused to travel for the reason that "it had all got too weird." To alleviate this, Brian was persuaded into making the trip. Ultimately, the band performed too poorly for the material to be released, and the recording allegedly suffered technical problems that could not be fixed in the studio. Brian would not go on another tour with the group until 1976, as part of the "Brian's Back!" campaign.

In late 1967, the group toured for the first time with outside musicians adding to the lineup of two guitars, bass, drums, and the occasional organ accompaniment: keyboardist Daryl Dragon and bassist Ron Brown. They eventually replaced Ron Brown with bassist/guitarist Ed Carter, also adding a percussionist. For a tour of Europe in late 1968, the band used a horn section. The touring band expanded during the late 1960s and early 1970s, with multiple percussionists, including Mike Kowalski, and keyboardists, including Billy Hinsche and Carli Muñoz, rotated through the touring band at this time.

On June 17, 1969, the Beach Boys became the first Western rock group to play in Czechoslovakia, then a Communist Bloc country, following the Soviet invasion of 1968.  Carl remembered: "The audience was incredible. It was a real joy for them to be able to see someone from the West. It was a kind of symbol of freedom for them."

In 1972, the group added two official members for the first time since Johnston's arrival in 1965: guitarist Blondie Chaplin and drummer Ricky Fataar. Chaplin departed in late 1973, with his role as bassist on the road taken by James Guercio, who was also the manager for the band Chicago. In 1974 they added a new percussionist Bobby Figueroa who replaced Mike Kowalski.

In 1976, Brian returned to the touring group as a keyboardist and bassist to promote the Brian's Back 'campaign' and the album 15 Big Ones. This also allowed him to promote the treatment that he was under for part of his first term of service under Eugene Landy. For the first time in nearly 6 years, The Beach Boys performed their first show with all five original members at Anaheim Stadium on July 3, 1976, which portions of the concert were based on the biographical concert film, "The Beach Boys: Good Vibrations tour". Between 1976 and 1978, the band used a horn section originally known as the Hornettes, which later changed its name to Tornado. For much of 1978, Brian served mostly as the band's bassist on the road, with then-bassist Ed Carter shifting to guitar.

1980s–1990s
In May 1979, Dennis was suspended from the touring band. He was absent from many concerts, with percussionist Bobby Figueroa moving to drums in his absence, but he returned in June 1980 for the 1980 tour of Europe. From mid-1979 until June 1980 Bobby was on drums for parts of every show. The supporting musicians for the rest of 1980 were Ed Carter on lead guitar, rhythm guitar, vocals, Joe Chemay on bass, vocals, Bobby Figueroa on percussion, vocals, drums for some songs, and Mike Meros on organ, keyboards, synthesizer, piano. They performed at Knebworth, England on June 21 which was the day before, and prior to the concert they sang happy birthday to Brian. This was  the first historic live album featuring all six band members to be released, titled Good Timin’: Live at Knebworth England 1980. On July 4, 1980, they played at the Washington Mall, notably featuring all six band members playing together. The band themselves provided the majority of the instrumentation in their concerts, only augmented by keyboardist Mike Meros, Figueroa, and Carter. The band was joined by bassist/vocalist Joe Chemay for a tour of Europe in 1980, during which Carter played guitar for the entire set. Bobby Figueroa left in 1981 and returned in July 1983.

In 1981, Carl quit the live group because of unhappiness with the band's nostalgic format and lackluster live performances, subsequently pursuing a solo career. He returned in May 1982 – after approximately 14 months of being away – on the condition that the group reconsider their rehearsal and touring policies and refrain from "Las Vegas-type" engagements. His place on guitar on the road was taken by longtime touring bassist/guitarist Ed Carter. Simultaneously, Adrian Baker joined as a touring vocalist and rhythm guitarist, to handle many of Brian's former vocals, especially his famous falsetto vocals. Carter's role as a bassist was taken by Ernie Knapp. Carter left the touring band in late 1981 after suffering a hernia, with his place on lead guitar being taken by Jeff Foskett. When Carl returned in May 1982, he overhauled the touring band, firing Knapp and rehiring Hinsche and Carter, among other personnel moves. Baker departed later that year, with Foskett taking his falsetto vocals.

In late 1982, Brian departed from the touring band to undergo a second term of care under Eugene Landy. Brian returned in May 1983 making semi-regular appearances through 1990. For the rest of 1983, Supporting musicians at the concerts included Ed Carter on bass, Billy Hinsche on rhythm guitar, keyboards, bass, vocals, Mike Kowalski on drums, and Jeff Foskett on vocals as well as lead guitar. Bobby Figueroa returned on percussion so Dennis Wilson and Mike Kowalski were both on drums. Four months later, Dennis died in December 1983, with his role as road drummer taken by touring percussionist Mike Kowalski.

Since 1980, the Beach Boys and the Grass Roots had performed Independence Day concerts at the National Mall in Washington, D.C., attracting large crowds. However, in April 1983, James G. Watt, President Ronald Reagan's Secretary of the Interior, banned Independence Day concerts on the Mall by such groups. Watt said that "rock bands" that had performed on the Mall on Independence Day in 1981 and 1982 had encouraged drug use and alcoholism and had attracted "the wrong element", who would steal from attendees. During the ensuing uproar, which included over 40,000 complaints to the Department of the Interior, the Beach Boys stated that the Soviet Union, which had invited them to perform in Leningrad in 1978, "...obviously ... did not feel that the group attracted the wrong element." Vice President George H. W. Bush said of the Beach Boys, "They're my friends and I like their music". Watt later apologized to the band after learning that President Reagan and First Lady Nancy Reagan were fans. White House staff presented Watt with a plaster foot with a hole in it, showing that he had "shot himself in the foot".

They returned to Washington, D.C. for Independence Day in 1984 and performed to a crowd of 750,000 people. On July 4, 1985, the group played to an afternoon crowd of over one million in Philadelphia, and the same evening they performed for over 750,000 people on the Mall in Washington. They also appeared nine days later at the Live Aid concert and performed at the "opening campfire" of the 1985 National Scout Jamboree for a crowd of over 32,000 members and guests of the Boy Scouts of America.

The band’s performances on July 4, 1985, marked the first time that actor John Stamos would sit in with The Beach Boys. Stamos would also collaborate with the band on You Again? and Full House and promote the band’s later releases on the show. Stamos’ occasional guest appearances have continued since 1985. Jardine's son Matt joined the touring band in 1988 as a percussionist, with Figueroa leaving by that summer.  In 1990, Foskett was let go from the band, with Baker returning. By 1992, Matt Jardine replaced Baker as the falsetto vocalist. By 1996, Carter and Hinsche were replaced by bassist Chris Farmer and keyboardist Tim Bonhomme.

In 1997, Phil Bardowell joined as a rhythm guitarist. Also in 1997, Carl was diagnosed with cancer; he performed for several months while his condition started to deteriorate. Bardowell briefly moved to lead guitar before former guitarist David Marks rejoined the band and took Carl's spot on the road, while Farmer took Carl's role as musical director. Love, Johnston, Marks, Glen Campbell, Dean Torrence of Jan and Dean, and John Stamos (who had been a semi-regular guest in the touring band since the 1980s and continues to do so) performed at a pre-show for the 1998 Super Bowl, as "A Tribute to The Beach Boys" featuring the aforementioned members. Carl Wilson died on February 6, 1998.

1998–present: Post-band split

2000s
After Carl died in 1998, the remaining members splintered. Following one final performance on May 9 as a benefit concert for the American Cancer Society in Detroit, Love, Johnston, and Marks continued to tour together, initially as "America's Band", but following several cancelled bookings under that name, Love sought authorization through Brother Records Inc. (BRI) to tour as "The Beach Boys" and secured the necessary license. Since 1999, Love is obligated to continue touring in order to maintain revenue flow to BRI. At the time, Wilson was also offered the license, but declined.

Jardine fought for the right to tour under the moniker "The Beach Boys Family & Friends" but was denied from using the name in any promotional or band name manner.  During this time, Jardine's group included his sons Matt and Adam, Brian Wilson's daughters Carnie and Wendy Wilson, Cass Elliot's daughter Owen, former touring bassist Ed Carter, former touring percussionist/drummer Bobby Figueroa. Jardine's group briefly included Daryl Dragon, who had formerly toured and recorded with The Beach Boys. Jardine formed a later group, also featuring former Beach Boys touring members, called the Endless Summer Band, one of the few names he was allowed to use as a result of the 1998–1999 lawsuits.
 
During the legal struggle, Matt Jardine left Love and Johnston's "The Beach Boys" touring group and was replaced by a returning Adrian Baker. Marks left the group in July 1999 because of his health, with Bardowell moving back to lead guitar in Marks' absence. In July 2001, longtime keyboardist Mike Meros was fired and replaced by John Cowsill, drummer for the 1960s family band The Cowsills. At the same time, Bardowell left the touring band and was replaced by Scott Totten. In 2004, Baker was replaced by former Papa Doo Run Run member Randell Kirsch. Love's son Christian joined as a second rhythm guitarist in 2006. Longtime drummer Mike Kowaski was fired in 2007, with Cowsill moving to drums in his absence. Chris Farmer was fired in 2007, with Kirsch moving to bass and Totten taking his role as musical director.

In 2008, Marks toured with the group briefly for a tour of Europe. Otherwise, the lineup remained until 2012.

2010s–2020s

Al Jardine appeared at two one-off shows in 2011 as a test for a possible future reunion. At the end of 2011, Wilson, Love, Jardine, Marks, and Johnston reunited for a new album and tour, using various members from Wilson's band, including former Beach Boys touring vocalist/guitarist Jeff Foskett, Probyn Gregory and Paul Von Mertens, who was the first woodwind player in the band since 1998, plus Totten and Cowsill from Love and Johnston's touring band. However, Love took the option to end the tour later in the year, and continued touring with Johnston and his pre-reunion touring band.  Jardine and Marks ultimately appeared with Wilson's band in 2013, with Jardine remaining into 2014 and onwards.

Jardine and Marks appeared at a one-off show in 2014, the Ella Awards where Love was honored as a singer. Love and Johnston's touring band was joined by Marks for several dates in 2014 and 2015, including a show in Jones Beach, California on July 5, 2014, where promoters had asked Jardine to appear. Ultimately, this plan fell through, with Jardine continuing to join Wilson, with whom he has toured since 2013. Foskett rejoined the touring band in 2014, with Love's son departing at the same time. Shortly afterward, Kirsch was replaced by former Four Freshmen vocalist Brian Eichenberger. In 2016, saxophonist/flutist Randy Leago was added, marking the first time since 1998, with the exception of Paul Von Mertens during the 2012 reunion tour, that the touring band included a woodwind player. Eichenberger left the touring band in 2018; Kirsch was a substitute before Eichenberger was replaced by Frankie Valli and The Four Seasons bassist Keith Hubacher. Christian Love rejoined the touring band in 2018 as a second rhythm guitarist. Jeff Foskett would leave the band in 2019 due to undergoing throat surgery and would be replaced by Brian Eichenberger. Foskett has made occasional appearances with the band since 2019.

In late April, 2020, when asked about a possible reunion, Al Jardine stated, "oh, it will happen. We'll probably do about 20 or 30 shows next year. That's the 60th anniversary next year." Mike Love also expressed interest in a reunion during an interview with Rolling Stone. Brian Wilson's manager later stated that Wilson had not been contacted about any sort of reunion. 
On March 15, 2022, Mike Love’s 81st birthday, Al Jardine once again hinted at a possible reunion in a post that was published on his official Facebook page.

Touring members 

The following only pertains to the Beach Boys' touring band.

Current
 Mike Love – vocals, tambourine, saxophone, electro-theremin (1961–present)
 Bruce Johnston – vocals, keyboards, bass, guitar, percussion (1965–1972, 1978–present; occasional special guest 1973–1977)
 Tim Bonhomme – keyboards (1995–present; hiatus in 2012)
 Scott Totten – vocals, guitar, bass, ukulele, percussion, musical director (2001–present; occasional substitute, 2000–2001)
 John Cowsill – vocals, drums, keyboards, percussion, guitar (2001–present; occasional substitute, 2000–2001)
 Christian Love – vocals, guitar (2006–2014, 2018–present; hiatus in 2012)
 Brian Eichenberger – vocals, guitar, bass (2015–2017, 2019–present)
 Randy Leago – saxophones, flutes, harmonicas, percussion (2016–present)
 Keith Hubacher – bass (2018–present) 

It should also be noted that, since 1985, actor John Stamos has appeared at select concerts and other live performances, contributing vocals, guitar, drums, and percussion.

Past

Founders
 Brian Wilson – vocals, bass, piano, organ, keyboards, electric piano, drums, timpani (1961–1964, 1976–1983, 2011–2012; occasional special guest 1965, 1967, 1970, 1984–1990, 1995, 1996)
 Carl Wilson – vocals, guitar, keyboards, bass (1961–1981, 1982–1997; died 1998)
 Dennis Wilson – vocals, drums, keyboards (1961–1979, 1980–1983; died 1983)
 Al Jardine – vocals, guitar, bass, banjo, piano, electronic drums (1961–1962, 1963–1998, 2011–2012; guest 2014)

1960s additions
 David Marks – vocals, guitar, drums (1962–1963, 1997–1999, 2008, 2011–2012; guest 1971, 1995, 2014, 2015)
 Glen Campbell – vocals, guitar, bass (1964–1965; died 2017)
 Ron Brown – bass, percussion (1967–1968)
 Daryl Dragon – keyboards, vibraphone (1967–1972; died 2019)
 Doug Dragon – piano, organ (1968)
 Dennis Dragon – percussion
 Ed Carter – bass, guitar, percussion, harmony and backing vocals, synth bass (1968–1981, 1982–1995)
 Mike Kowalski – percussion, drums (1968, 1970–1973, 1977–1978, 1981–2007)
 Bobby Torres – percussion
 Joel Peskin – woodwinds

1970s additions
 Luther Coffee – bass (1970)
 Billy Hinsche – vocals, keyboards, piano, organ, synthesizer, percussion, guitar, bass (1971–1977, 1982–1996; died 2021)
 Ricky Fataar – vocals, drums, percussion, guitar, pedal steel guitar, flute (1971–1974)
 Toni Tennille – keyboards (1972)
 Charles Lloyd – woodwinds, percussion (1972, 1976–1978)
 Blondie Chaplin – vocals, guitar, slide guitar, bass (1972–1973)
 Robert Kenyatta – percussion (1973, 1974)
 Putter Smith – bass (1973)
 Carli Muñoz – keyboards, percussion (1973–1977, 1978–1979)
 James Guercio – bass (1974–1975)
 Bobby Figueroa – vocals, percussion, drums, electric piano, electronic drums (1974–1981, 1984–1988; guest 2012)
 John Foss – trumpet (1976–1978)
 Michael Andreas – woodwinds (1976–1978)
 Rod Novak – saxophone (1976–1978)
 Charlie McCarthy – saxophones (1976–1978)
 Lance Buller – trumpet, trombone (1976–1978)
 Gary Griffin – keyboards (1977–1978, 2002)
 Sterling Smith – piano, keyboards (1978–1979)
 Mike Meros – keyboards, organ, synthesizer, piano (1979–2001; died 2007)

1980s additions
 Joe Chemay – bass, percussion (1980)
 Adrian Baker – vocals, guitar, electric piano (1981–1982, 1990–1992, 1998–2004)
 Jeff Foskett  – vocals, guitar, percussion, mandolin (1981–1990, 2012, 2014–2019)
 Clark Hohman – rhythm guitar, bass (1987)
 Ernie Knapp – bass, guitar (1981–1982)
 Matt Jardine –  vocals, percussion, assistant stage manager (1988–1998; guest 2011)

1990s additions
 John Renner – saxophone (1991)
 Richie Cannata – woodwinds, keyboard, percussion (1991–1998)
 Phil Bardowell – vocals, guitar (1997–2000)
 Chris Farmer – vocals, bass (1995–2007)

2000s additions
 Paul Fauerso – vocals, keyboards (2003)
 Randell Kirsch – vocals, guitar, bass (2004–2015; hiatus in 2012; guest 2018 & 2021)

2010s additions
 Probyn Gregory – guitar, electro-theremin, bass, trombone, trumpet (2012)
 Nicky "Wonder" Walusko – guitar (2012; died 2019)
 Scott Bennett – keyboards, vibraphone, backing vocals (2012)
 Darian Sahanaja – vocals, keyboards, vibraphone, percussion (2012)
 Nelson Bragg – percussion (2012)
 Paul von Mertens – saxophones, flutes, harmonicas (2012)
 Mike D'Amico – bass, drums (2012)
 Rob Bonfiglio – vocals, guitar (2019)
 Matthew Jordan – vocals, keyboard (2019)

Timeline

Discography 

Live albums
 Beach Boys Concert (1964)
 Live in London (1970)
 The Beach Boys in Concert (1973)
 Good Timin': Live at Knebworth England 1980 (2002)
 Songs from Here & Back (2006)
 Live – The 50th Anniversary Tour (2013)
 Live in Sacramento 1964 (2014)
 Live in Chicago 1965 (2015)
 Graduation Day 1966: Live At The University Of Michigan (2016)
 1967 – Live Sunshine (2017)
 The Beach Boys On Tour: 1968 (2018)

See also
 Lei'd in Hawaii (unreleased, 1967)

References
Citations

Bibliography

Further reading
 

Live performances
 
Beach Boys